The British Armed Forces, also known as His Majesty's Armed Forces, are the military forces responsible for the defence of the United Kingdom, its Overseas Territories and the Crown Dependencies. They also promote the UK's wider interests, support international peacekeeping efforts and provide humanitarian aid.

Since the formation of the Kingdom of Great Britain in 1707 (later succeeded by the United Kingdom), the British Armed Forces have seen action in a number of major wars involving the world's great powers, including the Seven Years' War, the American Revolutionary War, the Napoleonic Wars, the 1853–1856 Crimean War, the First World War, and the Second World War. Britain's victories in most of these decisive wars, allowed it to influence world events and establish itself as one of the world's leading military and economic powers.
As of October 2022, the British Armed Forces consist of: the Royal Navy, a blue-water navy with a fleet of 72 commissioned ships, together with the Royal Marines, a highly specialised amphibious light infantry force; the British Army, the UK's principal land warfare branch; and the Royal Air Force, a technologically sophisticated air force with a diverse operational fleet consisting of both fixed-wing and rotary aircraft. The British Armed Forces include standing forces, Regular Reserve, Volunteer Reserves and Sponsored Reserves.

The head of the Armed Forces is the British monarch, currently Charles III, to whom members of the forces swear allegiance. Long-standing constitutional convention, however, has vested de facto executive authority, by the exercise of royal prerogative, in the prime minister and the secretary of state for defence. The prime minister (acting with the Cabinet) makes the key decisions on the use of the armed forces. The UK Parliament approves the continued existence of the British Army by passing an Armed Forces Act at least once every five years, as required by the Bill of Rights 1689. The Royal Navy, Royal Air Force, and Royal Marines among with all other forces do not require this act. The armed forces are managed by the Defence Council of the Ministry of Defence, headed by the secretary of state for defence.

The United Kingdom is one of five recognised nuclear powers, a permanent member on the United Nations Security Council, founding and leading member of the NATO military alliance, and party to the AUKUS security pact and the Five Power Defence Arrangements. Overseas garrisons and training facilities are maintained at Ascension Island, Bahrain, Belize, Bermuda, British Indian Ocean Territory, Brunei, Canada, Cyprus, the Falkland Islands, Germany, Gibraltar, Kenya, Montserrat, Nepal, Qatar, Singapore, and the United States.

History

Organisational history
With the Acts of Union 1707, the armed forces of England and Scotland were merged into the armed forces of the Kingdom of Great Britain.

There were originally several naval and several military regular and reserve forces, although most of these were consolidated into the Royal Navy or the British Army during the 19th and 20th Centuries (the Royal Naval Air Service and the Royal Flying Corps of the British Army, by contrast, were separated from their parent forces in 1918 and amalgamated to form a new force, the Royal Air Force, which would have complete responsibility for naval, military and strategic aviation until the Second World War).

Naval forces included the Royal Navy, the Waterguard (subsequently HM Coastguard), and Sea Fencibles and River Fencibles formed as and when required for the duration of emergencies. The Merchant Navy and offshore fishing boat crews were also important manpower reserves to the armed naval forces (any seaman was liable to impressment, with many so conscripted especially during the two decades of conflict from the French Revolution until the end of the Napoleonic Wars, and from 1835 registered on the Register of Seamen to identify them as a potential resource), and many of their seamen would serve part time in the Royal Navy Reserve (created under the Naval Reserve Act of 1859) and Royal Naval Volunteer Reserve (created in 1903).

The British military (those parts of the British Armed Forces tasked with land warfare, as opposed to the naval forces) historically was divided into a number of military forces, of which the British Army (also referred to historically as the 'Regular Army' and the 'Regular Force') was only one. The oldest of these organisations was the Militia Force (also referred to as the Constitutional Force), which (in the Kingdom of England) was originally the main military defensive force (there otherwise were originally only Royal bodyguards, including the Yeomen Warders and the Yeomen of the Guard, with armies raised only temporarily for expeditions overseas), made up of civilians embodied for annual training or emergencies, and had used various schemes of compulsory service during different periods of its long existence.

The Militia was originally an all infantry force, organised at the city or county level, and members were not required to serve outside of their recruitment area, although the area within which militia units in Britain could be posted was increased to anywhere in the Britain during the Eighteenth Century, and Militia coastal artillery, field artillery, and engineers units were introduced from the 1850s. The Yeomanry was a mounted force that could be mobilised in times of war or emergency. Volunteer Force units were also frequently raised during wartime, which did not rely on compulsory service and hence attracted recruits keen to avoid the Militia. These were seen as a useful way to add to military strength economically during wartime, but otherwise as a drain on the Militia and so were not normally maintained in peacetime, although in Bermuda prominent propertied men were still appointed Captains of Forts, taking charge of maintaining and commanding fortified coastal artillery batteries and manned by volunteers (reinforced in wartime by embodied militiamen), defending the colony's coast from the Seventeenth Century to the Nineteenth Century (when all of the batteries were taken over by the regular Royal Artillery). The Militia system was extended to a number of English (subsequently British) colonies, beginning with Virginia and Bermuda. In some colonies, Troops of Horse or other mounted units similar to the Yeomanry were also created. The Militia and Volunteer units of a colony were generally considered to be separate forces from the Home Militia Force and Volunteer Force in the United Kingdom, and from the Militia Forces and Volunteer Forces of other colonies. Where a colony had more than one Militia or Volunteer unit, they would be grouped as a Militia or Volunteer Force for that colony, such as the Jamaica Volunteer Defence Force, which comprised the St. Andrew Rifle Corps (or Kingston Infantry Volunteers), the Jamaica Corps of Scouts, and the Jamaica Reserve Regiment, but not the Jamaica Militia Artillery. In smaller colonies with a single militia or volunteer unit, that single unit would still be considered to be listed within a force, or in some case might be named a force rather than a regiment or corps, such as is the case for the Falkland Islands Defence Force and the Royal Montserrat Defence Force. The Militia, Yeomanry and Volunteer Forces collectively were known as the Reserve Forces, Auxiliary Forces, or Local Forces. Officers of these forces could not sit on Courts Martial of regular forces personnel. The Mutiny Act did not apply to members of the Reserve Forces.

The other regular military force that existed alongside the British Army was the Board of Ordnance, which included the Ordnance Military Corps (made up of the Royal Artillery, Royal Engineers, and the Royal Sappers and Miners), as well as the originally-civilian Commissariat Stores and transport departments, as well as barracks departments, ordnance factories and various other functions supporting the various naval and military forces. The English Army, subsequently the British Army once Scottish regiments were moved onto its establishment following the Union of the Kingdoms of Scotland and England, was originally a separate force from these, but absorbed the Ordnance Military Corps and various previously civilian departments after the Board of Ordnance was abolished in 1855. The Reserve Forces (which referred to the Home Yeomanry, Militia and Volunteer Forces before the 1859 creation of the British Army Regular Reserve by Secretary of State for War Sidney Herbert, and re-organised under the Reserve Force Act, 1867) were increasingly integrated with the British Army through a succession of reforms over the last two decades of the Nineteenth Century (in 1871, command of the Auxiliary Forces in the British Isles was taken from the Lords-Lieutenant of counties and transferred to the War Office, though colonial Governors retained control of their militia and volunteer forces, and by the end of the century, at the latest, any unit wholly or partly funded from Army Funds was considered part of the British Army) and the early years of the Twentieth Century, whereby the Reserve Forces units mostly lost their own identities and became numbered Territorial Force sub-units of regular British Army corps or regiments (the Home Militia had followed this path, with the Militia Infantry units becoming numbered battalions of British Army regiments, and the Militia Artillery integrating within Royal Artillery territorial divisions in 1882 and 1889, and becoming parts of the Royal Field Artillery or Royal Garrison Artillery in 1902 (though retaining their traditional corps names), but was not merged into the Territorial Force when it was created in 1908 (by the merger of the Yeomanry and Volunteer Force). The Militia was instead renamed the Special Reserve, and was permanently suspended after the First World War (although a handful of Militia units survived in the United Kingdom, its colonies, and the Crown Dependencies). Unlike the Home, Imperial Fortress and Crown Dependency Militia and Volunteer units and forces that continued to exist after the First World War, although parts of the British military, most were not considered parts of the British Army unless they received Army Funds (as was the case for the Bermuda Militia Artillery and the Bermuda Volunteer Rifle Corps), which was generally only the case for those in the Channel Islands or the Imperial Fortress colonies (Nova Scotia, before Canadian confederation, Bermuda, Gibraltar, and Malta). Today, the British Army is the only Home British military force (unless the Army Cadet Force and the Combined Cadet Force are considered), including both the regular army and the forces it absorbed, though British military units organised on Territorial lines remain in British Overseas Territories that are still not considered formally part of the British Army, with only the Royal Gibraltar Regiment and the Royal Bermuda Regiment (an amalgam of the old Bermuda Militia Artillery and Bermuda Volunteer Rifle Corps) appearing on the British Army order of precedence and in the Army List.

Confusingly, and similarly to the dual meaning of the word Corps in the British Army (by example, the 1st Battalion of the King's Royal Rifle Corps was in 1914 part of the 6th Brigade that was part of the 2nd Infantry Division, which was itself part of 1st Army Corps), the British Army sometimes also used the term expeditionary force or field force to describe a body made up of British Army units, most notably the British Expeditionary Force, or of a mixture of British Army, Indian Army, or Imperial auxiliary units, such as the Malakand Field Force (this is similarly to the naval use of the term task force). In this usage, force is used to describe a self-reliant body able to act without external support, at least within the parameters of the task or objective for which it is employed.

Empire and World Wars

During the later half of the seventeenth century, and in particular, throughout the eighteenth century, British foreign policy sought to contain the expansion of rival European powers through military, diplomatic and commercial means – especially of its chief competitors; Spain, the Netherlands and France. This saw Britain engage in a number of intense conflicts over colonial possessions and world trade, including a long string of Anglo-Spanish and Anglo-Dutch wars, as well as a series of "world wars" with France, such as; the Seven Years' War (1756–1763), the French Revolutionary Wars (1792–1802) and the Napoleonic Wars (1803–1815). During the Napoleonic wars, the Royal Navy victory at Trafalgar (1805) under the command of Horatio Nelson (aboard HMS Victory) marked the culmination of British maritime supremacy, and left the Navy in a position of uncontested hegemony at sea. By 1815 and the conclusion of the Napoleonic Wars, Britain had risen to become the world's dominant great power and the British Empire subsequently presided over a period of relative peace, known as Pax Britannica.

With Britain's old rivals no-longer a threat, the nineteenth century saw the emergence of a new rival, the Russian Empire, and a strategic competition in what became known as The Great Game for supremacy in Central Asia. Britain feared that Russian expansionism in the region would eventually threaten the Empire in India. In response, Britain undertook a number of pre-emptive actions against perceived Russian ambitions, including the First Anglo-Afghan War (1839–1842), the Second Anglo-Afghan War (1878–1880) and the British expedition to Tibet (1903–1904). During this period, Britain also sought to maintain the balance of power in Europe, particularly against Russian expansionism, who at the expense of the waning Ottoman Empire had ambitions to "carve up the European part of Turkey". This ultimately led to British involvement in the Crimean War (1854–1856) against the Russian Empire.

The beginning of the twentieth century served to reduce tensions between Britain and the Russian Empire, partly due to the emergence of a unified German Empire. The era brought about an Anglo-German naval arms race which encouraged significant advancements in maritime technology (e.g. Dreadnoughts, torpedoes and submarines), and in 1906, Britain had determined that its only likely naval enemy was Germany. The accumulated tensions in European relations finally broke out into the hostilities of the First World War (1914–1918), in what is recognised today, as the most devastating war in British military history, with nearly 800,000 men killed and over 2 million wounded. Allied victory resulted in the defeat of the Central Powers, the end of the German Empire, the Treaty of Versailles and the establishment of the League of Nations.

Although Germany had been defeated during the First World War, by 1933 fascism had given rise to Nazi Germany, which under the leadership of Adolf Hitler re-militarised in defiance of the Treaty of Versailles. Once again tensions accumulated in European relations, and following Germany's invasion of Poland in September 1939, the Second World War began (1939–1945). The conflict was the most widespread in British history, with British Empire and Commonwealth troops fighting in campaigns from Europe and North Africa, to the Middle East and the Far East. Approximately 390,000 British Empire and Commonwealth troops lost their lives. Allied victory resulted in the defeat of the Axis powers and the establishment of the United Nations (replacing the League of nations).

The Cold War

Post–Second World War economic and political decline, as well as changing attitudes in British society and government, were reflected by the armed forces' contracting global role, and later epitomised by its political defeat during the Suez Crisis (1956). Reflecting Britain's new role in the world and the escalation of the Cold War (1947–1991), the country became a founding member of the NATO military alliance in 1949. Defence Reviews, such as those in 1957 and 1966, announced significant reductions in conventional forces, the pursuement of a doctrine based on nuclear deterrence, and a permanent military withdrawal East of Suez. By the mid-1970s, the armed forces had reconfigured to focus on the responsibilities allocated to them by NATO. The British Army of the Rhine and RAF Germany consequently represented the largest and most important overseas commitments that the armed forces had during this period, while the Royal Navy developed an anti-submarine warfare specialisation, with a particular focus on countering Soviet submarines in the Eastern Atlantic and North Sea.

While NATO obligations took increased prominence, Britain nonetheless found itself engaged in a number of low-intensity conflicts, including a spate of insurgencies against colonial occupation. However the Dhofar Rebellion (1962–1976) and The Troubles (1969–1998) emerged as the primary operational concerns of the armed forces. Perhaps the most important conflict during the Cold War, at least in the context of British defence policy, was the Falklands War (1982).

Since the end of the Cold War, an increasingly international role for the armed forces has been pursued, with re-structuring to deliver a greater focus on expeditionary warfare and power projection. This entailed the armed forces often constituting a major component in peacekeeping and humanitarian missions under the auspices of the United Nations, NATO, and other multinational operations, including: peacekeeping responsibilities in the Balkans and Cyprus, the 2000 intervention in Sierra Leone and participation in the UN-mandated no-fly zone over Libya (2011). Post-September 11, the armed forces have been heavily committed to the War on Terror (2001–present), with lengthy campaigns in Afghanistan (2001–2021) and Iraq (2003–2009), and more recently as part of the Military intervention against ISIL (2014–present). Britain's military intervention against Islamic State was expanded following a parliamentary vote to launch a bombing campaign over Syria; an extension of the bombing campaign requested by the Iraqi government against the same group. In addition to the aerial campaign, the British Army has trained and supplied allies on the ground and the Special Air Service, the Special Boat Service, and the Special Reconnaissance Regiment (British special forces) has carried out various missions on the ground in both Syria and Iraq.

The armed forces have also been called upon to assist with national emergencies through the provisions of the military aid to the civil authorities (MACA) mechanism. This has seen the armed forces assist government departments and civil authorities responding to flooding, food shortages, wildfires, terrorist attacks and, most notably, the ongoing COVID-19 pandemic; the armed forces' support to the latter falls under Operation Rescript, described as the UK's "biggest ever homeland military operation in peacetime" by the Ministry of Defence.

Figures released by the Ministry of Defence on 31 March 2016 show that 7,185 British Armed Forces personnel have lost their lives in medal earning theatres since the end of the Second World War.

Today

Command organisation

King Charles III, sovereign of the United Kingdom, is the Head of the Armed Forces, with officers and personnel swearing allegiance to him. Long-standing constitutional convention, however, has de facto vested military authority and associated royal prerogative powers in the prime minister and the secretary of state for defence, with the former (acting with the support of the Cabinet) making the key decisions on the use of the armed forces. The sovereign retains the power to prevent the unconstitutional use of the armed forces, including that of its nuclear arsenal.

The Ministry of Defence is the government department charged with formulating and executing defence policy. It currently employs 56,860 civilian staff members as of 1 October 2015. The department is administered by the secretary of state for defence who is assisted by the Minister of State for the Armed Forces, Minister for Defence Procurement, and Minister for Veterans' Affairs. Responsibility for the management of the forces is delegated to a number of committees: the Defence Council, Chiefs of Staff Committee, Defence Management Board and three single-service boards. The Defence Council, composed of senior representatives of the services and the Ministry of Defence, provides the "formal legal basis for the conduct of defence". The three constituent single-service committees (Admiralty Board, Army Board and Air Force Board) are chaired by the secretary of state for defence.

The chief of the defence staff (CDS) is the senior-most officer of the armed forces and is an appointment that can be held by an admiral, air chief marshal or general. Before the practice was discontinued in the 1990s, those who were appointed to the position of CDS had been elevated to the most senior rank in their respective service. The CDS, along with the permanent under secretary, are the principal military advisers to the secretary of state. All three services have their own respective professional chiefs; the First Sea Lord for the Royal Navy, the chief of the general staff for the Army and the chief of the air staff for the Royal Air Force.

Personnel

The British Armed Forces are a professional force with a strength of 153,290 UK Regulars and Gurkhas, 37,420 Volunteer Reserves and 8,170 "Other Personnel" . This gives a total strength of 198,880 "UK Service Personnel". As a percentage breakdown of UK Service Personnel, 77.1% are UK Regulars and Gurkhas, 18.8% are Volunteer Reserves and 4.1% are composed of Other Personnel. In addition, all ex-Regular personnel retain a "statutory liability for service" and are liable to be recalled (under Section 52 of the Reserve Forces Act (RFA) 1996) for duty during wartime, which is known as the Regular Reserve. MoD publications since April 2013 no longer report the entire strength of the Regular Reserve, instead they only give a figure for Regular Reserves who serve under a fixed-term reserve contract. These contracts are similar in nature to those of the Volunteer Reserve. , Regular Reserves serving under a fixed-term contract numbered 44,600 personnel.

The distribution of personnel between the services and categories of service on 1 April 2021 was as follows:

, there were a total of 9,330 Regular service personnel stationed outside of the United Kingdom, 3,820 of those were located in Germany. 138,040 Regular service personnel were stationed in the United Kingdom, the majority located in the South East and South West of England with 37,520 and 36,790 Regular service personnel, respectively.

Defence expenditure

According to the International Institute for Strategic Studies and the Stockholm International Peace Research Institute, the United Kingdom has the fourth-largest defence budget in the world. For comparison's sake, this sees Britain spending more in absolute terms than France, Germany, India or Japan, a similar amount to that of Russia, but less than China, Saudi Arabia or the United States. In September 2011, according to Professor Malcolm Chalmers of the Royal United Services Institute, current "planned levels of defence spending should be enough for the United Kingdom to maintain its position as one of the world's top military powers, as well as being one of NATO-Europe's top military powers. Its edge – not least its qualitative edge – in relation to rising Asian powers seems set to erode, but will remain significant well into the 2020s, and possibly beyond." The Strategic Defence and Security Review 2015 committed to spending 2% of GDP on defence and announced a £178 billion investment over ten years in new equipment and capabilities. On the 8th of March 2023 Prime Minister Rishi Sunak announced a further £5bn in defence spending with a long-term goal of an increased spending to 2.5% of GDP.

Nuclear weapons

The United Kingdom is one of five recognised nuclear weapon states under the Non-Proliferation Treaty and maintains an independent nuclear deterrent, currently consisting of four  ballistic missile submarines, UGM-133 Trident II submarine-launched ballistic missiles, and 160 operational thermonuclear warheads. This is known as Trident in both public and political discourse (with nomenclature taken after the UGM-133 Trident II ballistic missile). Trident is operated by the Royal Navy Submarine Service, charged with delivering a 'Continuous At-Sea Deterrent' (CASD) capability, whereby one of the Vanguard-class strategic submarines is always on patrol. According to the British Government, since the introduction of Polaris (Tridents predecessor) in the 1960s, from April 1969 "the Royal Navy's ballistic missile boats have not missed a single day on patrol", giving what the Defence Council described in 1980 as a deterrent "effectively invulnerable to pre-emptive attack". As of 2015, it has been British Government policy for the Vanguard-class strategic submarines to carry no more than 40 nuclear warheads, delivered by eight UGM-133 Trident II ballistic missiles. In contrast with the other recognised nuclear weapon states, the United Kingdom operates only a submarine-based delivery system, having decommissioned its tactical WE.177 free-fall bombs in 1998.

The House of Commons voted on 18 July 2016 in favour of replacing the Vanguard-class submarines with a new generation of s. The programme will also contribute to extending the life of the UGM-133 Trident II ballistic missiles and modernise the infrastructure associated with the CASD.

Former weapons of mass destruction possessed by the United Kingdom include both biological and chemical weapons. These were renounced in 1956 and subsequently destroyed.

Overseas military installations

The British Armed Forces maintain a number of overseas garrisons and military facilities which enable the country to conduct operations worldwide. The majority of Britain's permanent military installations are located on British Overseas Territories (BOTs) or former colonies which retain close diplomatic ties with the United Kingdom, and located in areas of strategic importance. The most significant of these are the "Permanent Joint Operating Bases" (PJOBs), located on the four overseas territories of Cyprus (British Forces Cyprus), Gibraltar (British Forces Gibraltar), the Falkland Islands (British Forces South Atlantic Islands) and Diego Garcia (British Forces British Indian Ocean Territories). While not a PJOB, Ascension Island (another BOT) is home to the airbase RAF Ascension Island, notable for use as a staging post during the 1982 Falklands War, the territory is also the site of a joint UK-US signals intelligence facility.

Qatar is home to RAF Al Udeid, a Royal Air Force outpost at Al Udeid Air Base which serves as the operational headquarters for No. 83 Expeditionary Air Group and its operations across the Middle East. A large Royal Navy Naval Support Facility (NSF) is located in Bahrain, established in 2016 it marks the British return East of Suez. In support of the Five Power Defence Arrangements (FPDA), the United Kingdom retains a naval repair and logistics support facility at Sembawang wharf, Singapore. Other overseas military installations include; British Forces Brunei, British Forces Germany, the British Army Training Unit Kenya, British Army Training Unit Suffield in Canada, British Army Training and Support Unit Belize, and British Gurkhas Nepal.

Some British Overseas Territories also maintain locally raised units and regiments; The Royal Bermuda Regiment, the Falkland Islands Defence Force, the Royal Gibraltar Regiment, the Royal Montserrat Defence Force, the Cayman Islands Regiment, and the Turks and Caicos Regiment. Though their primary mission is "home defence", individuals have volunteered for operational duties. The Royal Gibraltar Regiment mobilised section-sized units for attachment to British regiments deployed during the Iraq War. The Isle of Man, a Crown dependency hosts a multi-capability recruiting and training unit of the British Army Reserve.

Since 1969 Britain has had a military satellite communications system, Skynet, initially in large part to support East of Suez bases and deployments. Since 2015 Skynet has offered near global coverage.

Expeditionary forces
The British Armed Forces place significant importance in the ability to conduct expeditionary warfare. While the armed forces are expeditionary in nature, it maintains a core of "high readiness" forces trained and equipped to deploy at very short notice, these include; the Joint Expeditionary Force (Maritime) (Royal Navy), 3 Commando Brigade (Royal Marines), and 16 Air Assault Brigade (British Army). Frequently, these forces will act as part of a larger tri-service effort, under the direction of Permanent Joint Headquarters, or along with like-minded allies under the UK Joint Expeditionary Force. Similarly, under the auspices of NATO, such expeditionary forces are designed to meet Britain's obligations to the Allied Rapid Reaction Corps and other NATO operations.

In 2010, the governments of the United Kingdom and France signed the Lancaster House Treaties which committed both governments to the creation of a Franco-British Combined Joint Expeditionary Force. It is envisaged as a deployable joint force, for use in a wide range of crisis scenarios, up to and including high intensity combat operations. As a joint force it involves all three armed Services: a land component composed of formations at national brigade level, maritime and air components with their associated Headquarters, together with logistics and support functions.

The Armed Forces

Royal Navy

The Royal Navy is a technologically sophisticated naval force, and as of October 2022 consists of 72 commissioned ships with an additional 11 support vessels of various types operated by the Royal Fleet Auxiliary. Command of deployable assets is exercised by the Fleet Commander of the Naval Service. Personnel matters are the responsibility of the Second Sea Lord/Commander-in-Chief Naval Home Command, an appointment usually held by a vice-admiral.

The Surface Fleet consists of aircraft carriers, amphibious warfare ships, destroyers, frigates, patrol vessels, mine-countermeasure vessels, and other miscellaneous vessels. The Surface Fleet has been structured around a single fleet since the abolition of the Eastern and Western fleets in 1971. The recently built Type 45 destroyers are technologically advanced air-defence destroyers. The Royal Navy has commissioned two s, embarking an air-group including the advanced fifth-generation multi-role fighter, the F-35B.

A submarine service has existed within the Royal Navy for more than 100 years. The Submarine Service's four  nuclear-powered submarines carry Lockheed Martin's Trident II ballistic missiles, forming the United Kingdom's nuclear deterrent. Seven  nuclear-powered attack submarines have been ordered, with five completed and two under construction. The Astute class are the most advanced and largest fleet submarines ever built for the Royal Navy, and will maintain Britain's nuclear-powered submarine fleet capabilities for decades to come.

Royal Marines

The Royal Marines are the Royal Navy's amphibious troops. Consisting of a single manoeuvre brigade (3 Commando) and various independent units, the Royal Marines specialise in amphibious, arctic, and mountain warfare. Contained within 3 Commando Brigade are three attached army units; 383 Commando Petroleum Troop RLC, 29th Commando Regiment Royal Artillery, a field artillery regiment based in Plymouth, and 24 Commando Regiment Royal Engineers. The Commando Logistic Regiment consists of personnel from the Army, Royal Marines, and Royal Navy.

British Army

The British Army is made up of the Regular Army and the Army Reserve. The army has a single command structure based at Andover and known as "Army Headquarters". Deployable combat formations consist of two divisions (1st and 3rd Mechanised) and eight brigades. Within the United Kingdom, operational and non-deployable units are administered by two divisions, Force Troops Command, and London District.

The Army has 50 battalions (36 regular and 14 reserve) of regular and reserve infantry, organised into 17 regiments. The majority of infantry regiments contains multiple regular and reserve battalions. Modern infantry have diverse capabilities and this is reflected in the varied roles assigned to them. There are four operational roles that infantry battalions can fulfil: air assault, armoured infantry, mechanised infantry, and light role infantry. Regiments and battalions e.g.: the Parachute Regiment, exist within every corps of the Army, functioning as administrative or tactical formations.

Armoured regiments are equivalent to an infantry battalion. There are 14 armoured regiments within the army, ten regular and four yeomanry (armoured reserve), of which four are designated as "Armoured", three as "Armoured cavalry", and six as "Light Cavalry". Army 2020 Refine has seen developments which will further modify the Royal Armoured Corps. with two existing regiments forming the core of two new STRIKE Brigades. These two regiments, along with the Armoured Cavalry will be equipped with the "Ajax" armoured fighting vehicle, a new £3.5 billion procurement programme. The Ajax will be employed in the task organisation and roles of both Armoured Cavalry and Medium Armour. With a slight exception of the Household Cavalry, which maintains quasi-autonomy within the Household Division, armoured regiments and their yeomanry counterparts collectively form the Royal Armoured Corps.

Arms and support units are also formed into similar collectives organised around specific purposes, such as the Corps of Royal Engineers, Army Air Corps and Royal Army Medical Corps.

Royal Air Force

The Royal Air Force has a large operational fleet that fulfils various roles, consisting of both fixed-wing and rotary aircraft. Frontline aircraft are controlled by Air Command, which is organised into five groups defined by function: 1 Group (Air Combat), 2 Group (Air Support), 11 Group (Air and Space operations), 22 Group (training aircraft and ground facilities) and 38 Group (Royal Air Force's Engineering, Logistics, Communications and Medical Operations units). In addition 83 Expeditionary Air Group directs formations in the Middle East and the 38 Group combines the expeditionary combat support and combat service support units of the RAF. Deployable formations consist of Expeditionary Air Wings and squadrons—the basic unit of the Air Force. Independent flights are deployed to facilities in Afghanistan, the Falkland Islands, Iraq, and the United States.

The Royal Air Forces operates multi-role and single-role fighters, reconnaissance and patrol aircraft, tankers, transports, helicopters, unmanned aerial vehicles, and various types of training aircraft. Ground units are also maintained by the Royal Air Force, most prominently the RAF Police and the Royal Air Force Regiment (RAF Regt). The Royal Air Force Regiment essentially functions as the ground defence force of the RAF, optimised for the specialist role of fighting on and around forward airfields, which are densely packed with operationally vital aircraft, equipment, infrastructure and personnel . The Regiment contains nine regular squadrons, supported by five squadrons of the Royal Auxiliary Air Force Regiment. In addition, it provides the UK's specialist Chemical, Biological, Radiological and Nuclear capability. It also provides half of the UK's Forward Air Controllers and the RAF's contribution to the Special Forces Support Group. By March 2008, the three remaining Ground Based Air Defence squadrons (equipped with Rapier Field Standard C) had disbanded or re-roled and their responsibilities transferred to the British Army's Royal Artillery.

Ministry of Defence

The Ministry of Defence maintains a number civilian agencies in support of the British Armed Forces. Although they are civilian, they play a vital role in supporting Armed Forces operations, and in certain circumstances are under military discipline:

 The Royal Fleet Auxiliary (RFA) operates 13 ships which primarily serve to replenish Royal Navy warships at sea, and also augment the Royal Navy's amphibious warfare capabilities through its three  vessels. It is manned by 1,850 civilian personnel and is funded and run by the Ministry of Defence.
 The Ministry of Defence Police (MDP) has an established strength of 2,700 police officers which provide armed security, counter terrorism, uniformed policing and investigative services to Ministry of Defence property, personnel, and installations throughout the United Kingdom.
 The Defence Equipment and Support (DE&S) is the merged procurement and support organisation within the UK Ministry of Defence (United Kingdom). It came into being on 2 April 2007, bringing together the MoD's Defence Procurement Agency and the Defence Logistics Organisation under the leadership of General Sir Kevin O'Donoghue as the first Chief of Defence Materiel.  it has a civilian and military workforce of approx. 20,000 personnel. DE&S is overseen by the Minister for Defence Equipment, Support and Technology.
 The UK Hydrographic Office (UKHO) is an organisation within the UK government responsible for providing navigational and other hydrographic information for national, civil and defence requirements. The UKHO is located in Taunton, Somerset, on Admiralty Way and has a workforce of approximately 1,000 staff.

Recruitment

All three services of the British Armed Forces recruit primarily from within the United Kingdom, although citizens from the Commonwealth of Nations and the Republic of Ireland are equally eligible to join. The minimum recruitment age is 16 years (although personnel may not serve on armed operations below 18 years, and if under 18 must also have parental consent to join); the maximum recruitment age depends whether the application is for a regular or reserve role; there are further variations in age limit for different corps/regiments. The normal term of engagement is 22 years; however, the minimum service required before resignation is 4 years, plus, in the case of the Army, any service person below the age of 18. At present, the yearly intake into the armed forces is 11,880 (per the 12 months to 31 March 2014).

Excluding the Brigade of Gurkhas and the Royal Irish Regiment, as of 1 April 2014 there are approximately 11,200 Black and Minority Ethnic (BME) persons serving as Regulars across the three service branches; of those, 6,610 were recruited from outside the United Kingdom. In total, Black and Minority Ethnic persons represent 7.1% of all service personnel, an increase from 6.6% in 2010.

Since the year 2000, sexual orientation has not been a factor considered in recruitment, and homosexuals can serve openly in the armed forces. All branches of the forces have actively recruited at Gay Pride events. The forces keep no formal figures concerning the number of gay and lesbian serving soldiers, saying that the sexual orientation of personnel is considered irrelevant and not monitored.

Role of women

Women have been part of the armed forces, on and off, for centuries, more fully integrated since the early 1990s, including flying fast jets and commanding warships or artillery batteries. As of 1 April 2014, there were approximately 15,840 women serving in the armed forces, representing 9.9% of all service personnel. The first female military pilot was Flight Lieutenant Julie Ann Gibson while Flight Lieutenant Jo Salter was the first fast-jet pilot, the former flying a Tornado GR1 on missions patrolling the then Northern Iraqi No-Fly Zone. Flight Lieutenant Juliette Fleming and Squadron Leader Nikki Thomas recently were the first Tornado GR4 crew. While enforcing the Libyan No-Fly Zone, Flight Lieutenant Helen Seymour was identified as the first female Eurofighter Typhoon pilot. In August 2011, it was announced that a female lieutenant commander, Sarah West, was to command the frigate . In July 2016, it was announced that women would be allowed to serve in close combat, starting with the Royal Armoured Corps. In July 2017, the Secretary of Defence announced that women would be allowed to enlist in the RAF Regiment from September 2017, a year ahead of schedule. In 2018, women were allowed to apply for all roles in the British military, including the special forces. , the most senior serving woman is three-star Air Marshal Sue Gray.

March

See also

 Armed Forces Day (United Kingdom)
 List of military equipment of the United Kingdom
 Atholl Highlanders – The only legal private army in Europe under the command of the Duke of Atholl in Scotland
 Banknotes of the British Armed Forces
 British Forces Broadcasting Service
 Community Cadet Forces
 Military Covenant – The mutual obligations between the nation and its Armed Forces.
 Network-enabled capability – British military concept of achieving enhanced military effect through the better use of information systems. Similar to the US concept of network-centric warfare.
 The Championships, Wimbledon#Services stewards
 Uniforms of the British Armed Forces
 Military history of Scotland
 Armed forces of Wales

Notes

References

External links

 British Ministry of Defence (gov.uk)
 Defence Academy of the United Kingdom (.da.mod.uk)
 Royal Navy official website (royalnavy.mod.uk)
 Royal Marines official webpage (royalnavy.mod.uk)
 British Army official website (army.mod.uk)
 Royal Air Force official website (raf.mod.uk)

 
 
British Armed Forces deployments